The 2010 WPA World Nine-ball Championship was the professional nine-ball pocket billiards (pool) championship, sanctioned by the World Pool-Billiard Association (WPA). It was held from 29 June through 5 July in Doha, Qatar, hosted by the Qatar Billiards and Snooker Federation. Qualifying tournaments were held from 25 through 29 June in the same city.

Tournament format
Double elimination tournament during the group stage. All matches are races to nine racks.
There are 16 groups; each group has eight players. Two wins qualifies the player to the knockout round, while two losses eliminates them.
Single elimination tournament during the knockout stage. All matches are races to eleven racks, except for the final which is race to 13.

Group stage

Group 1

Group 2

Group 3

Group 4

Group 5

Group 6

Group 7

Group 8

Group 9

Group 10

Group 11

Group 12

Group 13

Group 14

Group 15

Group 16

Knockout stage

Upper half

Lower half

Semifinals and Final

References

2010
WPA World Nine-ball Championship
WPA World Nine-ball Championship
International sports competitions hosted by Qatar
Sports competitions in Doha